Paolo Pellicanò (born 27 November 1995) is an Italian football player. He plays for Vittorio Falmec.

Club career
He made his Serie C debut for Venezia on 17 September 2016 in a game against Ancona.

On 31 July 2019 it was confirmed, that Pellicanò had joined Trento. In June 2020, Pellicanó moved to newly promoted Serie D club Union San Giorgio Sedico. A year later, in June 2021, he joined Promozione club Fiori Barp Mas. In July 2022, he moved to Eccellenza side Vittorio Falmec.

References

External links
 

1995 births
People from Feltre
Living people
Italian footballers
Association football defenders
A.C. Belluno 1905 players
Venezia F.C. players
U.C. AlbinoLeffe players
A.C. Trento 1921 players
Serie C players
Serie D players
Sportspeople from the Province of Belluno
Footballers from Veneto